Varesemäed Landscape Conservation Area is a nature park in  Viljandi County, Estonia.

Its area is 24 ha.

The protected area was designated in 1964 to protect Varesemäed eskers and its surrounding areas. In 2009, the protected area was redesigned to the landscape conservation area.

References

Nature reserves in Estonia
Geography of Viljandi County